Phair is an English language surname. It is a variant spelling of fair. People with this surname include:

Caspar Phair
John Phair, Anglican bishop
Liz Phair, singer and actress
Lyle Phair, ice hockey player
Michael Phair, politician
Mike Phair, American football coach
Stephanie Phair, businessperson
Venetia Phair

References